Vice president of BJP Telangana State 

Dr. N. V. S. S. Prabhakar is a politician in Telangana and he was Uppal MLA from 2014 to 2018 Uppal Assembly constituency and also Telangana Legislative Assembly.

Early life
Prabhakar gained a degree in Civil Engineering from JNTU Hyderabad.

Political career

He helped many poor people by standing with them as People's leader. He contested first time from Uppal in 2009 Assembly elections.

In 2014 Telangana Assembly election he won as MLA for first time from Uppal Assembly constituency.

References

Living people
People from Telangana
Telangana politicians
Bharatiya Janata Party politicians from Telangana
Telangana MLAs 2014–2018
1966 births